Rishra Brahmananda Keshab Chandra High School is a Boys' High school located in Rishra, Hooghly, West Bengal. This school is affiliated to WBBSE, WBCHSE and WBSCVET.

History
Rishra Brahmananda Keshab Chandra High School established in 1961 with the affiliation of WBBSE. After some long years of success this school got WBCHSE affiliation for teaching Higher Secondary.
In 2005, when West Bengal State Council of Technical & Vocational Education and Skill Development was created, then the school got WBSCT&VE&SD affiliation for teaching Vocational courses.
Now the school is running successfully with the affiliations of 3 education boards.

Uniform
The school uniform is navy blue pant with white shirt. A new uniform for the school will be navy blue pant with shirt of grey checked pattern.

Alumnus

See also
Nabagram Vidyapith
Mahesh Sri Ramkrishna Ashram Vidyalaya (Higher Secondary)
Rishra High School
Education in India
List of schools in India
Education in West Bengal

References

External links

Boys' schools in India
High schools and secondary schools in West Bengal
Schools in Hooghly district
Educational institutions established in 1961
1961 establishments in West Bengal